Dong Bing (born 10 December 1996) is a Chinese ski jumper who competed in the 2022 Winter Olympics.

She competed at the 2022 Winter Olympics and placed 31st in the women's normal hill individual and placed 10th with her team in the mixed team event.

References

External links

1996 births
Living people
Chinese female ski jumpers
People from Jilin
Ski jumpers at the 2022 Winter Olympics
Olympic ski jumpers of China